Keith Braxton (born May 16, 1997) is an American professional basketball player for Belfius Mons-Hainaut of the BNXT League. He played college basketball for the Saint Francis Red Flash.

Early life and high school
Braxton grew up in Glassboro, New Jersey and attended Delsea Regional High School in nearby Franklinville. As a senior, he averaged 22.0 points and 9.8 rebounds per game and led the Crusaders to 24–6 record and the South Jersey Group 3 title game. After receiving scholarship offers from only Division II schools, Braxton opted to complete a post-graduate year at the Lawrenceville School.

College career
In his first year with the Red Flash, Braxton averaged 13.1 points along with 8.6 rebounds, 3.2 assists, and 1.4 steals per game. For his play he was named second team All-Northeast Conference (NEC) and the NEC Rookie of the Year. In his sophomore season, Braxton averaged 17.5 points and 9.5 rebounds per game and was named first team All-NEC.

As a junior, Braxton averaged 16.4 points (5th in the NEC), 9.7 rebounds (1st), 3.9 assists (7th) and 1.7 steals (2nd) per game and was named the 2019 Northeast Conference Player of the Year. Following the end of the season Braxton declared himself eligible for the 2019 NBA draft but did not hire an agent, thus retaining his eligibility. He ultimately decided to withdraw from the draft and return to St. Francis for his senior season. Braxton became the fourth player in Saint Francis's history to record 1,000 rebounds on January 4, 2020, in a 93–67 win over Central Connecticut. Braxton scored his 2,000th career point in the Red Flash's final regular season game against Robert Morris, making him the first player in Northeast Conference history to record 2,000 points and 1,000 rebounds in his career. He finished with 24 points and 12 rebounds in the loss. Braxton was named first team All-NEC for a third consecutive season. He averaged 17.6 points, 7.5 rebounds, 3.8 assists, and 1.3 steals per game as a senior.

Professional career
Braxton played for WoCo Showtime, a team featuring mainly Wofford alumni, in The Basketball Tournament 2021. On July 29, 2021, Braxton signed with Maccabi Ma'ale Adumim of the Israeli Liga Leumit.

On July 8, 2022, Braxton signed with Belgian team Belfius Mons-Hainaut of the BNXT League.

Career statistics

College

|-
| style="text-align:left;"| 2016–17
| style="text-align:left;"| Saint Francis (PA)
| 34 || 30 || 33.4 || .532 || .439 || .765 || 8.6 || 3.1 || 1.4 || .4 || 13.1
|-
| style="text-align:left;"| 2017–18
| style="text-align:left;"| Saint Francis (PA)
| 31 || 31 || 35.2 || .475 || .367 || .795 || 9.5 || 3.3 || 1.7 || .6 || 17.2
|-
| style="text-align:left;"| 2018–19
| style="text-align:left;"| Saint Francis (PA)
| 33 || 32 || 34.2 || .457 || .339 || .769 || 9.8 || 3.8 || 1.5 || .3 || 16.0
|-
| style="text-align:left;"| 2019–20
| style="text-align:left;"| Saint Francis (PA)
| 32 || 32 || 36.1 || .464 || .316 || .832 || 7.5 || 3.8 || 1.3 || .3 || 17.6
|- class="sortbottom"
| style="text-align:center;" colspan="2"| Career
| 130 || 125 || 34.7 || .479 || .354 || .792 || 8.8 || 3.5 || 1.5 || .4 || 15.9

See also
List of NCAA Division I men's basketball players with 2000 points and 1000 rebounds

References

External links
Saint Francis Red Flash bio
College Statistics at Sports-Reference.com
RealGM profile

1997 births
Living people
21st-century African-American sportspeople
African-American basketball players
American expatriate basketball people in Israel
American men's basketball players
Basketball players from New Jersey
Belfius Mons-Hainaut players
Lawrenceville School alumni
People from Glassboro, New Jersey
Saint Francis Red Flash men's basketball players
Shooting guards
Sportspeople from Gloucester County, New Jersey